In SQL, a window function or analytic function is a function which uses values from one or multiple rows to return a value for each row. (This contrasts with an aggregate function, which returns a single value for multiple rows.) Window functions have an OVER clause; any function without an OVER clause is not a window function, but rather an aggregate or single-row (scalar) function.

Example
As an example, here is a query which uses a window function to compare the salary of each employee with the average salary of their department (example from the PostgreSQL documentation):SELECT depname, empno, salary, avg(salary) OVER (PARTITION BY depname) FROM empsalary;
Output:
  depname  | empno | salary |          avg          
 ----------+-------+--------+----------------------
 develop   |    11 |   5200 | 5020.0000000000000000
 develop   |     7 |   4200 | 5020.0000000000000000
 develop   |     9 |   4500 | 5020.0000000000000000
 develop   |     8 |   6000 | 5020.0000000000000000
 develop   |    10 |   5200 | 5020.0000000000000000
 personnel |     5 |   3500 | 3700.0000000000000000
 personnel |     2 |   3900 | 3700.0000000000000000
 sales     |     3 |   4800 | 4866.6666666666666667
 sales     |     1 |   5000 | 4866.6666666666666667
 sales     |     4 |   4800 | 4866.6666666666666667
 (10 rows)
The PARTITION BY clause groups rows into partitions, and the function is applied to each partition separately. If the PARTITION BY clause is omitted (such as if we have an empty OVER() clause), then the entire result set treated as a single partition. For this query, the average salary reported would be the average taken over all rows.

Window functions are evaluated after aggregation (after the GROUP BY clause and non-window aggregate functions, for example).

Syntax 
According to the PostgreSQL documentation, a window function has the syntax of one of the following:function_name ([expression [, expression ... ]]) OVER window_name
function_name ([expression [, expression ... ]]) OVER ( window_definition )
function_name ( * ) OVER window_name
function_name ( * ) OVER ( window_definition )where window_definition has syntax:[ existing_window_name ]
[ PARTITION BY expression [, ...] ]
[ ORDER BY expression [ ASC | DESC | USING operator ] [ NULLS { FIRST | LAST } ] [, ...] ]
[ frame_clause ]frame_clause has the syntax of one of the following:{ RANGE | ROWS | GROUPS } frame_start [ frame_exclusion ]
{ RANGE | ROWS | GROUPS } BETWEEN frame_start AND frame_end [ frame_exclusion ]frame_start and frame_end can be UNBOUNDED PRECEDING, offset PRECEDING, CURRENT ROW, offset FOLLOWING, or UNBOUNDED FOLLOWING. frame_exclusion can be EXCLUDE CURRENT ROW, EXCLUDE GROUP, EXCLUDE TIES, or EXCLUDE NO OTHERS.

expression refers to any expression that does not contain a call to a window function.

Notation:

 Brackets [] indicate optional clauses
 Curly braces {} indicate a set of different possible options, with each option delimited by a vertical bar |

Example 
Window functions allow access to data in the records right before and after the current record. A window function defines a frame or window of rows with a given length around the current row, and performs a calculation across the set of data in the window.
       NAME |
 ------------
       Aaron| <-- Preceding (unbounded)
      Andrew|
      Amelia|
       James|
        Jill|
      Johnny| <-- 1st preceding row
     Michael| <-- Current row
        Nick| <-- 1st following row
     Ophelia|
        Zach| <-- Following (unbounded)
In the above table, the next query extracts for each row the values of a window with one preceding and one following row: SELECT
  LAG(name, 1) 
    OVER(ORDER BY name) "prev",
  name, 
  LEAD(name, 1) 
    OVER(ORDER BY name) "next"
 FROM people
 ORDER BY nameThe result query contains the following values:
 |     PREV |     NAME |     NEXT |
 |----------|----------|----------|
 |    (null)|     Aaron|    Andrew|
 |     Aaron|    Andrew|    Amelia|
 |    Andrew|    Amelia|     James|
 |    Amelia|     James|      Jill|
 |     James|      Jill|    Johnny|
 |      Jill|    Johnny|   Michael|
 |    Johnny|   Michael|      Nick|
 |   Michael|      Nick|   Ophelia|
 |      Nick|   Ophelia|      Zach|
 |   Ophelia|      Zach|    (null)|

History 
Window functions were introduced in SQL:2003 and had functionality expanded in later specifications.

MySQL added support for window functions in version 8 in 2018, and MariaDB introduced first window functions with version 10.2.

See also 

 Select (SQL)#Limiting result rows

References 

Articles with example SQL code
SQL